Allen Miller (April 28, 1907 Pontiac, Michigan – August 18, 1967 Standish, Michigan) was an American racecar driver active in the 1930s and 1940s.

He is not related to Indy driver Al Miller, who raced at Indy in the mid-1960s.

Miller is one of three drivers to have participated in the Indianapolis 500 with a prosthetic leg.

Indianapolis 500 results

References

1907 births
1967 deaths
Indianapolis 500 drivers
Sportspeople from Pontiac, Michigan
Racing drivers from Detroit
Racing drivers from Michigan